This is a list of notable media outlets in Zamboanga City, a city in the Zamboanga Peninsula administrative region of the Philippines. Although geographically separated, and an independent and chartered city, Zamboanga City is grouped with the province of Zamboanga del Sur for statistical purposes, yet governed independently from it.

Television and cable stations

Analog
DXLL-TV – Channel 3 (ABS-CBN Zamboanga; formerly operated by GMA Network from 1976-1995) (Defunct)
DXXX-TV – Channel 5 (RPN Zamboanga/Nine Media Corporation-CNN Philippines Zamboanga)
DXVC-TV – Channel 7 (People's Television Zamboanga)
DXLA-TV – Channel 9 (GMA Zamboanga; formerly operated by First United Broadcasting Corporation, a former ABS-CBN affiliate)
DXGB-TV - Channel 11 Golden Broadcast Professionals, Inc. also an affiliated with TV5 Zamboanga & DXDE-TV 29 Zamboanga
DXZB-TV – affiliate station of IBC Zamboanga from the early 1979 until 1998, and 2006 onwards
Mindanao Examiner TV – in Zamboanga and Pagadian cities
DXVB-TV – Channel 21 GTV
S+A Zamboanga – Channel 23 (Defunct)
Hope Channel Zamboanga – Channel 25 (Defunct)
ETC Zamboanga – Channel 27 (P/A)
DXDE-TV – Channel 29 One Sports
DXBE-TV – Channel 31 BEAM TV Zamboanga (Defunct)
SMNI Zamboanga – Channel 39 (TV relay station of Sonshine TV 43 Davao) (Defunct)
2nd Avenue Zamboanga – Channel 41 (P/A)
GNN Western Mindanao – UHF Channel 43 (Defunct)
DZRH News Television DXHT-TV Zamboanga – UHF Channel 45 (Defunct)
DXMR-TV – UHF Channel 53

Digital
DXBE-DTV – Channel 31 (575.143 MHz) BEAM TV Zamboanga
DXAX-DTV – Channel 40 (629.143 MHz) eMedia E-TV News(now migrated and became the first digital TV channel in Zamboanga Region)
DXLA-TV – Channel 41 (635.143 MHz) (GMA Zamboanga)
DXGB-TV – Channel 51 (695.143 MHz) Golden Broadcast Professionals, Inc. also an affiliated with TV5 Zamboanga

Cable and satellite providers
Sky Cable Zamboanga
Mindanao Cable TV
Margos Cable Vision
Cignal TV
G Sat

Production houses
Mindanao Examiner – Regional Newspaper / Video Productions / Internet Broadcast News / News Podcast (Also provides photography services, private and corporate media consultancy)

Radio stations
Manila Broadcasting Company
DXZH-855 DZRH Zamboanga (relay station from Manila)
DXCM-97.9 Love Radio
DXHT-102.7 Yes! The Best
Brigada Mass Media Corporation
DXZB-89.9 Brigada News FM
Bombo Radyo Philippines
DXCB-93.9 Star FM
Golden Broadcast Professionals, Inc.
DXEL Magic 95.5 (affiliate station of Quest Broadcasting Inc., on air since May 1, 2000)
Radio Mindanao Network
DXRZ-900 RMN Zamboanga
DXWR-96.3 iFM
Radio Philippines Network
DXXX-1008 Radyo Ronda
RT Broadcast Specialists
 DXLL-1044/DXKZ-91.5 Mango Radio Zamboanga (relay stations from Davao
Far East Broadcasting Company
DXAS-1116 Your Community Radio
Philippine Broadcasting Service
DXMR-1170 Radyo Pilipinas
Catholic Media Network
DXVP-1467 El Radyo Verdadero
Viva Entertainment
DXUE-103.5 Halo-Halo Radio
eMedia Productions / Westwind Broadcasting Corporation
DXWW-105.9 eMedia News FM
Zamboanga State College of Marine Sciences and Technology
DXCP-106.7 Marino News FM
Armed Forces of the Philippines - Civil Relations Service
DXWC-88.3 Peace FM
Bandera News Philippines/Fairwaves Broadcasting Network
Radyo Bandera 89.1 News FM Zamboanga
Philippine Collective Media Corporation
107.5 FMR Zamboanga
Global Satellite Technology Services / Yes2Health Advertising, Inc.
99.5 XFM Zamboanga
Capitol Broadcasting Center / RSV Broadcasting Services
DXCZ-104.3 Radyo Agong

News programs
TV Patrol Chavacano]
Buenos Días Zamboanga
One Mindanao (simulcast on GMA 5 Davao)
At Home with GMA Regional TV (simulcast on GMA 5 Davao)

References

Mass media in Zamboanga City
Zamboanga City-related lists
Philippine television-related lists